Springkällan is a human-made artesian spring located in Rättvik, Sweden. The spring was created by accident in 1869 during an oil prospecting drilling in the Siljan Ring impact crater. The spring freezes in winter, creating an unusual pillar-like form of ice.

References

Landforms of Dalarna County
Springs of Sweden
1869 in Sweden